The 2020 Supercopa Uruguaya was the third edition of the Supercopa Uruguaya, Uruguay's football super cup. It was held on 1 February 2020 between 2019 Torneo Intermedio winners Liverpool and 2019 Primera División champions Nacional.

The match was played at Estadio Domingo Burgueño in Maldonado, being this the first time the match was played away from Estadio Centenario in Montevideo due to it undergoing remodeling works.

Liverpool defeated Nacional by a 4–2 score after extra time in order to claim their first Supercopa title.

Teams

Match details

References

2020 in Uruguayan football
Supercopa Uruguaya
Supercopa Uruguaya 2020
February 2020 sports events in South America